Humphrey Sydenham may refer to:

 Humphrey Sydenham (1694–1757), politician 
 Humphrey Sydenham (1591–1650), royalist divine